Theo Mthembu (27 February  1927 – 1 March 2007) was a South African professional boxer and renowned boxing trainer. Mthembu is known to have produced boxers such as Anthony "Blue Jaguar" Morodi, Levy " Golden Boy" Madi, and world renowned Jacob "Baby Jake" Matlala.

Awards

Mthembu has received numerous awards for his contribution to boxing in South Africa. Some of his awards include:

 Jack Cheetham Memorial award - for contributing in sport
 President Award in Silver - awarded by former President Nelson Mandela
 Life Time Achievement Award - by Boxing South Africa
 King Kong Meritorious Award 
 Special Recognition for Achievement - by the Gauteng Government 
 Order of Ikhamanga in Silver - for contributing in boxing

References

1927 births
2007 deaths
Flyweight boxers
Boxers from Johannesburg
South African male boxers
Boxing trainers